Ilian Evtimov (born April 28, 1983) is a Bulgarian-French professional basketball player for Cholet of the French Pro A. He is a 6 ft 7 in (2.01 m) power forward.

College career
Evtimov played college basketball in the United States at NCAA Division 1 school North Carolina State University, where he played with the NC State Wolfpack, from 2001-2006.

Professional career
Evtimov signed his first professional contract with Virtus Bologna in 2006  and joined the Deutsche Bank Skyliners for the 2007-08 season. Starting from 2010, Evtimov played for Élan Chalon and with the club he won the Pro A in 2012. He also won the French Basketball Cup in 2011 and 2012, while in the last Cup victory he was named French Basketball Cup Final MVP.

On June 9, 2016, Evtimov signed with Cholet Basket.

French national team
Evtimov played with the French U22 national team at the 2002 FIBA Europe Under-20 Championship, where he won a bronze medal.

Personal
A French national, Ilian is the youngest son of Bulgarian basketball star Ilia Evtimov and the brother of professional Euroleague player Vassil Evtimov.

References

External links
 Euroleague.net Profile

1983 births
Living people
BC Levski Sofia players
Bulgarian men's basketball players
Bulgarian expatriate sportspeople in France
CB Estudiantes players
Cholet Basket players
Élan Chalon players
French men's basketball players
Liga ACB players
NC State Wolfpack men's basketball players
Power forwards (basketball)
Skyliners Frankfurt players
Small forwards
Virtus Bologna players